Naomi Ruth Stevens (November 29, 1925 – January 13, 2018) was an American character actress of film and television from the 1950s through the 1980s. She appeared in almost 100 roles over the years, usually depicting mothers, landladies, gossips, or neighbors.

Stevens began entertaining in vaudeville at age 2. She had expanded into radio, film, and theater by age 5. She appeared on a radio program on KNX in Los Angeles and was featured in Paramount Pictorials. Stevens attended the Grace Waugh Bowman School of Theatricals.

Her most frequent characterizations were Italian, Jewish, Latin, or East European, and usually with a comic touch. She appeared in many television series and in such feature films as Valley of the Dolls, Buona Sera, Mrs. Campbell, and The Apartment (as Mrs. Dreyfuss, the supportive "Jewish mother" type to Shirley MacLaine's character, Fran Kubelik). She portrayed Sgt. Bella Archer in the ABC crime drama Vegas (1978). She made guest appearances on numerous television series. Her last role was on Days of Our Lives as Mrs. Nazareo in 1989. On old-time radio, Stevens portrayed Daphne Royce on Brenthouse and Irene Barbour on One Man's Family.

Stevens died on January 13, 2018, in Reseda, Los Angeles, California, aged 92.

Partial filmography

 Have Gun-Will Travel (1957, TV Series) as Marga / Ma Kafka / Maria
 The Black Orchid (1958) as Guilia Gallo
 Rescue 8 (1959, TV Series) as Angela
 The Apartment (1960) as Mrs. Mildred Dreyfuss
 The Lawless Years (1961, TV Series) as Rose
 Perry Mason (1961–1964, TV Series) as Agnes / Fanny Werbler / Mrs. Kransdorf
 Dr. Kildare (1961–1965, TV Series) as Mrs. Gast / Aunt Kasia / Mrs. Mendoza / Mrs. Gitlin
 Convicts 4 (1962) as Resko's Mother
 McHale's Navy (1963, TV Series) as Mrs. Gruber
 The Farmer's Daughter (1964, TV series) as Mrs. Golden
 The Alfred Hitchcock Hour (1964, Episode: "The Gentleman Caller") as Mrs. Goldy the Building Superintendent 
 Honeymoon Hotel (1964) as Woman at Garbage Dump (uncredited)
 Bob Hope Presents the Chrysler Theatre (1964, TV Series) as Aunt Clara / Maria Pia
 Joy in the Morning (1965) as Mrs. Ridinski (uncredited)
 The Art of Love (1965) as Mrs. Sarah Fromkis
 Frankie and Johnny (1966) as Princess Zolita (uncredited)
 Hogan's Heroes (1967, Episode: "The Crittendon Plan") as Nadya
 Valley of the Dolls (1967) as Miss Steinberg
 The Flying Nun (1967–1970, TV Series) as Sister Teresa / Mrs. Emanuel / Señora Rosales
 The Shakiest Gun in the West (1968) as Squaw (uncredited)
 To Die in Paris (1968, TV Movie) as Mama Dendier
 Buona Sera, Mrs. Campbell (1968) as Rosa
 The Doris Day Show (1968–1969, TV Series) as Juanita (housekeeper)
 My Three Sons (1969–1970, TV Series) as Mama Rossini
 Love, American Style (1969–1973, TV Series) as Hazel / Mildred / Rosa / Mrs. Straub aka Mother / Annie Ellsworth 
 The Hawaiians (1970) as Queen Liliuokalani
 Room 222 (1970, TV Series) as Rose
 Fly Me (1973) as Toby's Mother
 Superdad (1973) as Mrs. Levin (neighbor)
 Hard Times (1975) as Madam
 The Montefuscos (1975, TV Series) as Rose Montefusco
 Hustle (1975) as Woman Hostage
 The Practice (1976, TV Series) as Mrs. Friedman
 Opening Night (1977) as Crying Mourner (uncredited)
 Vega$ (1978–1979, TV Series) as Sgt. Bella Archer
 The Triangle Factory Fire Scandal (1979, TV Movie) as Mrs. Goldstein
 Hotel (1982, TV Series) as Mrs. Tomasino
 Taxi (1983, TV Series) as Aunt Lucia

References

External links
 
 
 

1925 births
2018 deaths
Actresses from New Jersey
American film actresses
American television actresses
Actors from Trenton, New Jersey
20th-century American actresses
Vaudeville performers
American radio actresses
American child actresses
21st-century American women